The 2018–19 Winthrop Eagles men's basketball team represented Winthrop University during the 2018–19 NCAA Division I men's basketball season. The Eagles, led by seventh-year head coach Pat Kelsey, played their home games at the Winthrop Coliseum in Rock Hill, South Carolina as members of the Big South Conference.

Previous season
The Eagles finished the 2017–18 season 19–12, 12–6 in Big South play to finish in a tie for second place. They defeated Gardner–Webb in the quarterfinals of the Big South tournament before losing in the semifinals to Radford.

Roster

Schedule and results

|-
!colspan=9 style=| Non-conference regular season

|-
!colspan=9 style=| Big South regular season

|-
!colspan=9 style=| Big South tournament

References

Winthrop Eagles men's basketball seasons
Winthrop
Winthrop Eagles men's basketball
Winthrop Eagles men's basketball